This is a list of lists of sheriffs and stewards of Kingston upon Hull:

 List of sheriffs of Kingston upon Hull
 List of stewards of Kingston upon Hull

Kingston upon Hull
Kingston upon Hull